Dr Kamalain Shaath is the current president of the Islamic University of Gaza (IUG). He has a Ph.D. degree in civil engineering. Prior to his current position, he was a professor at the Civil Engineering department at the same university. He received his Ph.D. from The University of Leeds in UK, M.Sc. from United States and B.Sc. from Cairo University, Egypt, all in civil engineering. Prior joining IUG, he used to work at An-Najah National University as instructor and assistant professor.

External links

Dr Kamalain Shaath's homepage

References

Living people
Academic staff of the Islamic University of Gaza
Alumni of the University of Leeds
Cairo University alumni
Academic staff of An-Najah National University
Year of birth missing (living people)
Palestinian civil engineers